Out Of Here is an album by Tim Keegan and Departure Lounge, released on Keegan's Meek Giant label in 2000.

Track listing
"Music For Pleasure"
"The New You"
"Slow News Day"
"Disconnected"
"Win Them Back"
"Save Me From Happiness"
"Postcard From A Friend"
"Johnny A"
"Stay On The Line"
"We've Got Everything We Need"
"1911999"

External links
 Pitchfork review of the album

Out Of Here
2000 debut albums